is a retired Japanese ice hockey goaltender who competed at the 1960 Winter Olympics and 1962 World Ice Hockey Championships.

After retiring from competitions, Tomita worked at the Japan Ice Hockey Federation, first as management director and then as executive director. In parallel, for 27 years he was a TV commentator for NHK. He was also a member of the Japanese Olympic Committee. In 1978 he joined the International Ice Hockey Federation (IIHF), and served as its vice-president from 1994 to 2012.

References

External links
 

1936 births
Living people
Sportspeople from Tokyo
Japanese ice hockey goaltenders
Olympic ice hockey players of Japan
Ice hockey players at the 1960 Winter Olympics
Japanese ice hockey administrators
IIHF Hall of Fame inductees